Aleksandr Vladimirovich Gorin (born 7 January 1981) is a Russian former professional footballer.

Club career
He made his debut in the Russian Premier League in 2002 for FC Torpedo Moscow.

References

1981 births
People from Lipetsk Oblast
Living people
Russian footballers
Russia under-21 international footballers
Russian expatriate footballers
Expatriate footballers in Ukraine
FC Kryvbas Kryvyi Rih players
FC Torpedo Moscow players
FC Fakel Voronezh players
FC Shinnik Yaroslavl players
Russian Premier League players
FC Salyut Belgorod players
FC Sibir Novosibirsk players
Ukrainian Premier League players
Association football defenders
FC Nosta Novotroitsk players
Sportspeople from Lipetsk Oblast